A campaign setting is usually a fictional world which serves as a setting for a role-playing game or wargame campaign.  A campaign is a series of individual adventures, and a campaign setting is the world in which such adventures and campaigns take place. Usually a campaign setting is designed for a specific game (such as the Forgotten Realms setting for Dungeons & Dragons) or a specific genre of game (such as medieval fantasy, or outer space/science fiction adventure).  There are numerous campaign settings available both in print and online. In addition to published campaign settings available for purchase, many game masters create their own settings, often referred to as "homebrew" settings or worlds.

While obviously connected to game materials, campaign settings are supported also by other media, such as novels and comic books.

Examples of major campaign settings include numerous settings within Dungeons & Dragons, as well others such as BattleTech.

Types of setting

The use of the term "world" in describing a campaign setting is loose, at best. Campaign worlds such as the World of Greyhawk detail entire cosmologies and timelines of thousands of years, while the setting of a game such as Deadlands might only describe one nation within a brief segment of alternate history.

There are three primary types of campaign setting:
 The first type of setting is specifically tied to a single game, such as Warhammer or World of Darkness, where the game has only the one setting.
 The second type of setting is for games that have multiple settings such as modern Dungeons & Dragons or generic roleplaying systems such as GURPS or Fudge
 The third type of setting is developed without being tied to a particular game system. Typically this last sort are developed first as stand-alone works of fiction, which are later adapted to one or more role playing systems such as the Star Wars universe or Middle-earth, though there are a few exceptions of settings which were designed explicitly for role playing gaming, but without a specific system in mind, such as Hârn.
Nikolai Butler distinguished two types of campaign settings, homebrewed and official. According to games journalist David M. Ewalt, established campaign settings have the advantage of providing a wealth of material written by professional game designers. When creating a homebrew setting "you're on your own - but without limits and preconceptions", which can lead to more interesting games as the game master may be "more invested in the material and passionate about its development".

Setting genres have touched on every genre of high-action fictional storytelling from role-playing's roots in fantasy to science fiction in settings such as Traveller to horror in the World of Darkness. Even modern-day spy thriller-oriented settings such as Spycraft have been introduced.

A small number of campaign settings fuse two or more genres in a single game. In GURPS Infinite Worlds, for example, the characters play "Infinity Patrol" agents who travel to alternate worlds. Shadowrun combines fantasy with cyberpunk, Castle Falkenstein draws on fantasy and steampunk elements, and Torg mixes fantasy, science fiction, pulp and horror elements while Feng Shui combines Chinese historical fantasy with kung fu action tropes and dystopian science fiction.

Fantasy
Fantasy settings draw their inspiration almost exclusively from fantasy literature, such as the works of J. R. R. Tolkien and Robert E. Howard. The setting in these games is usually a world with a level of technology similar to that of medieval Europe. Fantasy elements include magic and supernatural/mythological creatures, such as dragons, elves, dwarves and orcs.

The very first role-playing settings from the late 1960s and early 1970s (World of Greyhawk, and Blackmoor) were based in the fantasy genre, primarily based on the popularity of fantasy works by authors such as J. R. R. Tolkien and C. S. Lewis. Over the decades since, fantasy role-playing has evolved and expanded tremendously, even developing its own subgenres.  The genre can be subdivided into high fantasy where supernatural events are commonplace, and low fantasy where there are few or no supernatural aspects.

While pure fantasy games were initially popular, games such as Ars Magica popularized the notion of fantasy set within elements of real-world history. Later games would update this concept even further, bringing fantasy gaming into the present day in a genre known as urban fantasy (e.g. Mage: The Ascension) or even into the future by combining urban fantasy with cyberpunk (e.g. Shadowrun).  Even when the main setting of a game is not taken directly from the history of our world, they still tend to draw heavily on historical models, though distorted by the presence of magic; also, as gods often have direct and tangible interactions with the world, religion is usually very unlike our world.

Fantasy typically remains the most played roleplaying genre. RPGs of the fantasy genre are sometimes collectively called "Fantasy roleplaying games" ("FRP").

See Category:Fantasy roleplaying games

Science fiction
Science fiction settings are inspired by science fiction literature. The setting is generally in the future, sometimes near future but also quite often in the far future, though in many cases the setting bears no connection to the world we live in, e.g. Star Wars. Common elements involve futuristic technology, contact with alien life forms, experimental societies, and space travel. Psionic abilities (i.e. ESP and telekinesis) often take the place of magic. The genre can be divided similarly with science fiction literature into subgenres, such as cyberpunk or space opera.

Science fiction settings for role playing were  introduced with Metamorphosis Alpha in 1976 -- dungeon adventuring on a "lost starship" -- and in 1977 soon followed with Traveller, a space opera game. Its Third Imperium setting covered multiple worlds and alien races. Due to the success of Star Wars, and the impact that the franchise had on popular culture, many science fiction settings were introduced or adapted, especially during the 1980s. The scope of a science fiction setting is typically larger than that of a fantasy setting, encompassing multiple worlds or even entire galaxies. Such settings often involve detailed accounts of military and/or trading operations and organizations.

Gamma World, introduced in 1978, explored the replacement of traditional elements of fantasy settings with the pseudo-scientific elements of post-apocalyptic fiction. These settings lend themselves to the "adventuring" mode of most fantasy games, and thus focus on developing specific locations and loosely defined cultural or racial groups.

See Category:Science fiction roleplaying games

Historical
Historical settings take place in the past. Because historical games often overlap the fantasy genre, a distinguishing mark is that fantasy games are set on a "fantasy world" similar to but distinct from Earth, while historical games are set in the past of Earth. Settings that have been explored in roleplaying games include Pendragon (Arthurian), Sengoku (Japanese warring states), Recon (Vietnam War), Tibet (historical Tibet), and Fantasy Imperium (historical Europe).

The roleplaying game Ars Magica is one such 'historical' game, set in what its source materials call 'Mythic Europe': while history is generally accepted to unfold as depicted in real-world historical accounts, Ars Magica presents a detailed background for its setting, tying the existence of magic, wizards and the Faerie realms into a historical context while allowing for 'fantasy' elements to come into play.

See Category:Historical roleplaying games

Horror
Horror settings take their inspiration from horror literature. Horror role-playing can be divided into two major groups.

Modern horror settings such as Call of Cthulhu were first introduced in the early 1980s, creating a hybrid of fantasy horror and modern thrillers. These settings tend to focus on organizations and societies in which generally normal people fight against malevolent supernatural entities. Such games often are structured as a straightforward "monster hunt", though Call of Cthulhu also involves a great deal of investigation and clue-finding.

The second style of horror game reverses the roles, with the player characters being such supernatural creatures as vampires and werewolves. This second style was popularized by White Wolf's Vampire: The Masquerade. A series of games by the same company followed, sharing a setting called the World of Darkness.

The setting in both these styles of horror games is often contemporary, between the 19th century and the current day. Creating the correct mood and air of suspense is very important in these games.

Some elements of fantasy role-playing settings were often related to the horror genre. Vampires and ghosts are typical fare in most such settings, for example. Campaign settings that combine horror and fantasy elements on an even footing include the Dungeons & Dragons settings Ravenloft and Ghostwalk. The D&D Heroes of Horror sourcebook also provides ways to emphasize horror elements within a more typical fantasy milieu.

See Category:Horror roleplaying games

Humor
Humor games are based on creating situations which are funny or have a funny premise. Humor is not usually a genre in itself (although it can be), but a modifier added to other genres.  In 1983 Bureau 13 introduced humorous modern horror/fantasy gaming. In 1984, the Paranoia game introduced a science fiction setting which used a post-apocalypse world in which to set a tongue-in-cheek game of futile struggle against a computer-controlled dictatorship. Humorous settings for multiple genres have since been released. Humorous settings typically develop few if any locations and organizations, focusing instead on specific characters of note and general tone.

See Category:Comedy roleplaying games

Multi-genre
Multi-genre games that mix elements of different genres together. For example, Deadlands presents a Wild West in which elements of horror, magic and steampunk are prevalent,  and Castle Falkenstein presents a Victorian-era world with Jules Verne- and H. G. Wells-inspired technology alongside fantasy elements like magics and the denizens of Faerie.

Similarly, Shadowrun presents a futuristic dystopia that draws heavily from Cyberpunk influences such as cyberized limbs, megacorporations and the virtual reality internet in the form of the Matrix, while also including, as a major plot element, the return of magic to the world and the classic Dungeons and Dragons races of elves, dwarfs, trolls and so forth. Likewise, the superhero genre typically emulates the comic book universes such as the DC and Marvel Universes as a form of science fantasy set in contemporary setting where all fantastic elements from futuristic technology to mythic beings co-exist.

More extreme mashups are also possible; Torg combined fantasy, science fiction, pulp, and horror elements while Feng Shui combined Chinese historical fantasy with Kung Fu action tropes and dystopian science fiction. In GURPS Infinite Worlds, the characters played "Infinity Patrol" agents who travel to alternate worlds characterized by different genre elements including steampunk and horror.

Licensed
Licensed games are tie-ins to larger media franchises. They were once rare but the number of these games is increasing. Licensed games are usually considered part of their franchise's genre rather than a genre in and of themselves. Many licensed products are now defunct because of license expiration, while others such as Blood of Heroes take a system designed for a licensee's game world and create a new world to match it.

See also
Fantasy world
List of campaign settings
List of fictional universes
Campaign (role-playing games)
Dungeons & Dragons campaign settings

References

 
Role-playing game terminology

de:Spielwelt